Daifallah is a male Muslim given name meaning guest of God. It may refer to

Abdul Latif Dayfallah (born 1930), Yemeni politician
Daifallah Bouramiya (born 1957), Kuwaiti politician
Daifallah Masadeh (1938–2015), Jordanian lawyer and politician
Noureddine Daifallah (born 1960), Moroccan calligrapher, Abstract Artist
Ibrahim Daif Allah Neman Al Sehli (born 1965), Saudi held in Guantanamo